Pandivere is a village in Väike-Maarja Parish, Lääne-Viru County, in northeastern Estonia. It has a population of 101 (as of 1 January 2011).

The surrounding upland Pandivere Heights is named after the village.

Poet and writer Jakob Liiv worked as a schoolteacher in Pandivere from 1884 to 1886.

Pandivere Manor 
Pandivere Manor was established in 1801 by detaching it from the nearby Kärsa Manor. It belonged to the Rennenkampffs. Nowadays, since a fire in the 1980s, the single-storey main building lies in ruins.

References

External links
Pandivere Manor at Estonian Manors Portal

Villages in Lääne-Viru County